Flatiron Mountain may refer to:
Flatiron Mountain (Idaho), mountain peak in Lemhi County, Idaho
Flatiron Mountain (Lincoln County, Montana), mountain in Montana
Flatiron Mountain (Madison County, Montana), mountain in Montana
Flatiron Mountain (Powell County, Montana), mountain in Montana

See also
Flatirons, rock formations near Boulder, Colorado that are part of Green Mountain